Ohio's 82nd House of Representatives district is one of the many constituencies of the Ohio General Assembly, the legislature of the U.S. state of Ohio. This district is represented by Representative Craig Riedel.

The 82nd district encompasses Van Wert, Defiance, and Paulding Counties, as well as parts of northern Auglaize County.

Representatives

Elections

2020

2018 
The 2018 election in Ohio will be held on November 6, 2018.

Incumbent representative Craig Riedel is eligible for re-election and is widely expected to run again.

Republican primary

Candidates 
Declared
 Craig Riedel, incumbent representative

Democratic primary

Candidates 
Declared
 Aden Baker, high school student and Democratic Central Committeeman

2016 
District 82 was at the center of a bitter primary campaign between Incumbent representative Tony Burkley and his challenger, former Nucor-Vulcraft salesman Craig Riedel. Both campaigned on the ideals of fiscal and social conservatism, with the Riedel campaign portraying Burkley as a 'career politician' who didn't understand the needs of the district.

Campaign themes included the Charter Schools/School Voucher program, the Ohio Budget, and making Ohio a "right-to-work" state.

Reidel went on to defeat Burkley in the primary, with the latter winning only his home county (Paulding).

2014 
In 2014, incumbent representative Tony Burkley faced Brett Eley of Wapakoneta. Burkley won the primary in a landslide and went on to win the general election unopposed.

2012 
In 2012, former Paulding County Commissioner Tony Burkley ran unopposed in the Republican primary.

Pete Schlegel, a country musician and farmer from Defiance County, ran as an independent. He  criticized Burkley for his history in local politics and ran an "outsider" campaign. Burkley handily defeated Schlegel in the general election, 59-41%

See also
Ohio House of Representatives

References

Ohio House of Representatives districts